The 230th (Voltigeurs Canadiens-Français) Battalion, CEF was a unit in the Canadian Expeditionary Force during the First World War.

History 
Based in Ottawa, Ontario, the unit began recruiting in early 1916 in eastern Ontario, Hull, Quebec, and the surrounding district.  The battalion also drew heavily from members of the 70th Regiment, based in Hull, Quebec.  The battalion became the 230th Forestry Battalion in October 1916.  This unit apparently sent six drafts overseas in 1917; these were on January 23, January 26, March 3, May 3, June 2, and June 25 (SS Justicia).

The 230th Battalion was disbanded in 1918.

Perpetuation 
Following the war, it was perpetuated by the 70th Regiment, which is still active as Le Régiment de Hull.

References
Meek, John F. Over the Top! The Canadian Infantry in the First World War. Orangeville, Ont.: The Author, 1971.

Battalions of the Canadian Expeditionary Force